CUH may be:

 Cambridge University Hospitals NHS Foundation Trust, United Kingdom
 Cork University Hospital, Ireland
 Copper hydride, a highly unstable compound